Deh Gardan (also Romanized as Deh Gardān) is a village in Hablerud Rural District, in the Central District of Firuzkuh County, Tehran Province, Iran. At the 2006 census, its population was 550, in 160 families.

References 

Populated places in Firuzkuh County